This is a list of Irish women's One-day international cricketers. Ireland Women played their first ODI on 28 June 1987, in a 3 match series against Australia. Overall, 95 Irish women have played in at least one women's one-day international. A One Day International, or an ODI, is an international cricket match between two representative teams, each having ODI status. An ODI differs from test matches in that the number of overs per team is limited, and that each team has only one innings. The list is arranged in the order in which each player won her first ODI cap. Where more than one player won her first ODI cap in the same match, those players are listed alphabetically by surname.

Key

Players 
Statistics are correct as of 9 November 2022.

Notes

See also
List of Ireland women Test cricketers
List of Ireland women Twenty20 International cricketers

References 

Ireland
 
One
Cricket